Malacoctenus margaritae, the Margarita blenny, is a species of labrisomid blenny native to the Pacific coast of Central America from Costa Rica to Panama.  This species can reach a length of  TL.

References

margaritae
Fish of Mexican Pacific coast
Western Central American coastal fauna
Fish described in 1944